The Florida–Miami baseball rivalry is an American college baseball rivalry between the University of Florida Gators and University of Miami Hurricanes.

The Florida and Miami baseball series began in 1950, and the game has usually been played at least two times during each regular season since 1960. Since the 2004 season, the two teams have played a weekend series in the early portion of the non-conference schedule, alternating each season between Coral Gables and Gainesville. The two programs have faced off in fourteen editions of the NCAA Division I Baseball Tournament, meeting in the College World Series in 2015.

The two programs' relevance on the national scale combined with the geographical proximity has forged a fierce rivalry among both fanbases, with both squads considering the series to be among the most important on their schedule during the season, and has consistently attracted near-capacity crowds at each respective home stadium.

Game results

See also

References 

College baseball rivalries in the United States
Florida Gators baseball
Miami Hurricanes baseball
Sports rivalries in Florida